Juan de O'Donojú y O'Ryan (30 July 1762 – 8 October 1821) was a Spanish-Irish military officer, diplomat and Viceroy of New Spain from 21 July 1821 to 28 September 1821 during the Mexican War of Independence, he was the last viceroy of New Spain. 

He was appointed viceroy during the last stages of the Mexican War of Independence with the hopes of accommodating the Mexican independence movement, but upon his arrival to New Spain in August, 1821 O’Donoju found that the overwhelming majority of the nation had already been lost to Spain. He officially recognized Mexican independence through the Treaty of Córdoba, but died of pleurisy shortly after. His recognition of Mexican independence was disowned by the Spanish government which would not officially recognize the Mexican government until 1836.

Early life
O'Donojú was born in Seville and was of Irish descent (O'Donoghue). O'Donojú was the third of five siblings conceived in the second marriage of his father, Richard Dunphy O'Donnohue; with Alicia O'Ryan.

Prior to the birth of O'Donojú, both of his paternal and maternal families had immigrated to Spain in the 1720s, fleeing the anti-Catholic Penal Laws which had been instituted in the Kingdom of Ireland by the Protestant Ascendancy.

Military career 
He joined the army at a young age and served with distinction in the Peninsular War.

O'Donoju was the Chief of Staff to General Gregorio García de la Cuesta during the Battle of Talavera (27 and 28 July 1809). On 11 July 1809, O'Donojú served as an interpreter between Cuesta and the British commander, Lieutenant-General Sir Arthur Wellesley (later created, in May 1814, The 1st Duke of Wellington), as the two met to make their campaign plans. The meeting was somewhat strained as Cuesta answered many of Wellesley's questions with a simple "yes" or "no" which O'Donojú tactfully explained.

He was promoted on campaign merits until reaching the rank of Lieutenant General. He managed to reach Cádiz, which it was the only Spanish city free from French occupation.

In 1814, O'Donoju was named Minister of War by the Regency. With the return of Ferdinand VII, he became aide de camp to the king.

O'Donoju was a friend of the liberal rebel Rafael del Riego. In 1820, at the time of the re-establishment of the Spanish Constitution of 1812, O'Donoju was the captain general of Andalusia. O'Donoju reached the rank of lieutenant general and was a high officer in the Spanish Freemasons. In 1821, the Cortes Generales appointed him captain general and "jefe político superior", which gave him the authority (but not the official title) of the former viceroys. At the time O'Donojú left for New Spain, the Cortes was considering to greatly expand the autonomy granted to the overseas Spanish possessions according to the restored constitution.

Viceroy of New Spain

Appointment
His appointment to the viceregality has been attributed to the influence of the Mexican deputies then representing New Spain in the Cortes in accordance with the Constitution of 1812. The influence of Miguel Ramos Arizpe has especially been noted.  His appointment has also been attributed to the Spanish liberals who had chosen O’Donoju with the hopes that his liberal principles could help extinguish the Mexican movement for independence.

Arrival in New Spain
Juan O'Donojú arrived in Veracruz on the ship the Asia on August 3, 1821. Upon his arrival however he found that the overwhelming majority of the country was in the hands of the revolutionaries. Only the garrisons of Mexico City, Veracruz, and Acapulco remained loyal to Spain. He was faced with the choice of either leaving the country immediately or attempting to come to some sort of arrangement with the rebels. He released a manifesto upholding the liberalism then reigning in Spain, and asked for Mexicans to send their grievances to the Spanish Cortes which was already working on elevating New Spain to a new level of autonomy, which could include electing their own leader.  

He entered into friendly communications with colonel Santa Anna, head of the garrison at Veracruz, and arranged an agreement on August 5 for the Spanish officials to enter the city on friendly terms. He then sent commissioners to Agustín de Iturbide inviting him to a conference, which was agreed to take place at the villa of Córdoba. He was glad to leave Veracruz as two of his nephews had contracted and died from yellow fever, known to be endemic to the port. Santa Anna escorted him as far as Jalapa, by orders of Iturbide.

Recognition of Mexican Independence
With Iturbide he signed the Treaty of Córdoba, granting official Spanish sanction to the Plan of Iguala, with Iturbide slightly altering the condition that the monarch which was to be chosen for Mexico did not need to be a member of the Spanish royal family. The Spanish governor of Veracruz, Jose Dávila did not agree with such arrangements and resolved to retreat to the fortress of San Juan de Ulúa to hold his ground. The Spanish major general Francisco Novella in Mexico City also refused to recognize the Treaty of Cordoba, but he was reluctantly forced to abandon the capital with the Spanish expeditionary troops.  

O'Donojú entered Mexico City on the afternoon of September 26, and dined with the Ayuntamiento before housing himself at the Casa de Moncada. On September 27, he received Iturbide at the National Palace, and went out with him to the main balcony to watch the entrance of the Army of the Three Guarantees. On September 28 he presented himself at the main hall of the palace to install the provisional governmental junta, and he signed the act of independence.

Death
Shortly after he caught pleurisy which worsened to the point where he was administered the Last Rites on the night of October 7. He died the following day in the afternoon.

See also

 List of heads of state of Mexico

Notes

References
 "Juan O'Donojú", in Enciclopedia de México, vol. 10 (Mexico City, 1987).
 García Puron, Manuel, México y sus gobernantes, vol. 1 (Mexico City: Joaquín Porrua, 1984).
 Orozco L., Fernando, Fechas Históricas de México (Mexico City: Panorama Editorial, 1988), .
 Orozco Linares, Fernando, Gobernantes de México( Mexico City: Panorama Editorial, 1985), .

1762 births
1821 deaths
1821 in Mexico
1821 in New Spain
Mexican independence activists
Mexican people of Irish descent
People from Seville
Spanish generals
Spanish military personnel of the Napoleonic Wars
Spanish people of Irish descent
Viceroys of New Spain